In San Francisco is a live album by Hindustani classical musician Ravi Shankar. It was released in 1967 on vinyl. It was later digitally remastered and released in CD format through Angel Records.

Track listing
"Raga Bhupal Todi - Tala Ardha Jaital" (Live) – 16:50
"Spoken Introduction by Ravi Shankar (Part 1)" – 0:23
"Tabla Solo in Shikhar Tal" (Live) – 7:14
"Spoken Introduction by Ravi Shankar (Part 2)" – 1:02
"Dhun: Tala Dadra" (Live) – 24:47

References

External links
Amazon.com listing

Ravi Shankar albums
1967 live albums
Angel Records live albums
World Pacific Records live albums
Albums produced by Richard Bock (producer)